Lobonematidae is a family of jellyfishes belonging to the order Rhizostomeae.

Genera:
 Lobonema Mayer, 1910
 Lobonemoides Light, 1914

References

 
Daktyliophorae
Cnidarian families